Asqar Jadigerov (born 5 January 1980 in Uzbek SSR, Soviet Union) is an Uzbekistani professional footballer who plays as a midfielder.

Club career
Asqar Jadigerov started his footballing career at FK Andijan and transferred to Kazakhstan Premier League side Yassi and Ordabasy for several seasons. He joined Pakhtakor Tashkent in 2010 where he took part in the 2010 AFC Champions League.

He moved to China and signed a contract with Nanchang Hengyuan in July 2010. He made his Chinese Super League debut against Liaoning Whowin on 14 July and scored his first goal for Nanchang on 8 August.

In February 2013 he signed a contract FK Andijan after playing the second half of 2012 season at FK Dinamo Samarqand.

References

External links
 

1980 births
Living people
Uzbekistani footballers
Association football midfielders
FC Ordabasy players
Shanghai Shenxin F.C. players
FC Bunyodkor players
Asqar Jadigerov
FK Dinamo Samarqand players
Uzbekistan Super League players
Kazakhstan Premier League players
Chinese Super League players
Asqar Jadigerov
Uzbekistani expatriate footballers
Uzbekistani expatriate sportspeople in Kazakhstan
Uzbekistani expatriate sportspeople in China
Uzbekistani expatriate sportspeople in Thailand
Expatriate footballers in Kazakhstan
Expatriate footballers in China
Expatriate footballers in Thailand